Lowy (also spelled Löwy or Lőwy) is a surname of Ashkenazi Jewish origin. It may refer to:

 Albert Löwy (1816–1908), British Hebrew scholar and religious leader
Benjamin Lowy (born 1979), American photographer
Dóra Lőwy (born 1977), Hungarian handball player
Douglas R. Lowy (born 1942), American doctor
Emanuel Löwy (1857–1938), Austrian archaeologist
Frank Lowy (born 1930), Australian businessman
Frederick Lowy (born 1933), Canadian educator
Fritzi Löwy (1910–1994), Austrian Olympic swimmer
Isaac Lowy (1793–1847), Hungarian businessman
Meshulim Feish Lowy (1921–2015), Hungarian rabbi
Michael Löwy (born 1938), Brazilian sociologist 
Otto Lowy (1921–2002), Canadian actor and radio host
Slavko Löwy (1904–1996), Croatian architect
Steven Lowy (born 1962), Australian businessman
Yitzchak Lowy (1887–1942), Polish actor

See also
Lowy Institute for International Policy
Loewy
Lowi (disambiguation)

Jewish surnames
Yiddish-language surnames